Chaygaon is a town in Kamrup district of Assam, India; situated on the south bank of the Brahmaputra river. It is 36.8 km from major town Guwahati. The town is known for "Maa Chandika Devalaya", a Shakti Peeth, where thousands of devotees visit during Durga Puja. Historical "Mer Ghar" of Chand Sadagar situated in Champak Nagar, Chaygaon.

Etymology
The word Chaygaon is derived from two Kamrupi Assamese words soy (ছয়) (six) and gau (গাউ) (village) meaning six villages. Anglicised as Chaygaon based on the IAST values of the Eastern Nagari script.

Culture 
The people from different religions are residing here, with distinct Kamrupi culture. The devotee throng here to pay their homage to the ancient temple of 'Chandika'. The Mer Ghar of Chand Sadagar, the merchant of the ancient times, evidences the story of Behula and Lakhinder, his daughter in law and son.

History
The town was part of Kamapitha division of Ancient Kamrup. It was within capital region of ancient Kamrup kingdom. In pre-modern period it remained part of eastern Kamrup region. In nineteenth century, it became part of newly formed administrative undivided Kamrup district. In 2003, after bifurcation of old district, it is included in Kamrup rural district.

Places of interest

Chand Sadagar's Mer Ghar
It is a site with which a mythological story is attached to a merchant named Chanda Sadagar and his son Lakhindar and his daughter-in-law Beula. 

The legend says that Chanda Sadagar, who was a devotee of Lord Siva, once got a curse from 'Nag Devata' (the God of Snake) that he would have no descendants any further as his only son would be killed on the latter's wedding night. To prevent this, Lakhindar and his bride was confined in the "Mer Ghar" (a specially built sealed house for the newly wed couple to prevent entry of snakes ). 

However, despite every effort, Lakhindar was bitten to death by 'Nag Devata' . It was Beula 's relentless offerings and prayers that saved her husband's life later on. Ruins of 'Merghar' and replica of Siva idols are still found around this site.

Education

Chhaygaon College
The Chhaygaon College established in the year 1974 is the most important educational institution in the greater Chaygaon. The college is located at an easily accessible site beside the National Highway number 37 at a distance of about 40 km west of Gauhati University and about 25 km from the Gauhati International Airport. It is a co-educational Institution providing instructions up to Three-Year Degree level in Arts and Commerce faculties and affiliated to Gauhati University.

Transport
Chaygaon is at National Highway 17; is connected to nearby cities and towns with buses and other modes of transportation. It has a Railway station at Dhobargaon and LGB International Airport is situated at a distance of 25 km.

See also
 Boko, Kamrup
 Bijay Karmakar

References

Cities and towns in Kamrup district